The Roman Forum is an archaeological area in Mérida, Spain. It was the main public area of the Roman city of Emerita Augusta, founded in 25 BC by Emperor Augustus. The city had another forum, the Provincial Forum, built in 50 AD. Together with the other archaeological sites of the city, it was inscribed in the UNESCO World Heritage List in 1993. 

Mérida, or Emerita Augusta in Latin, was once the capital of the Lusitania imperial province that included most of Portugal as well as the western central portion of Spain. It contains many common places found in a Roman city: buildings such as theatres, temples, forums, and arenas. Mérida’s ruins are mostly still intact, despite the passage of time of approximately 2,000 years. Mérida preserves more important ancient Roman monuments than any other city in Spain

Buildings
 Temple of Diana. Despite its name, wrongly assigned in its discovery, the building was dedicated to the imperial cult. Erected during Augustus' reign with local granite, later it was partly re-used for the palace of the Count of Corbos.
 Temple of Mars
 Portico, built in the 1st century AD
 Basilica, located in front of the temple of Diana
 Baths

See also
National Museum of Roman Art

External links
Official Mérida webpage 
Mérida, Spain

Merida
Forum, Mérida
Buildings and structures in Mérida, Spain
History of Extremadura
Buildings and structures completed in the 1st century BC
1st-century BC establishments in the Roman Republic
Tourist attractions in Extremadura